Major-General Sir Thomas Morgan, 1st Baronet (1604 – 13 April 1679) was a professional soldier from Wales who fought for Parliament during the Wars of the Three Kingdoms. As deputy Commander-in-Chief, Scotland, he played an important role in the 1660 Stuart Restoration and was rewarded with being made a baronet.

Biography 
Morgan was born in Wales.  At 16, having at that time little knowledge of any language but Welsh, Morgan enlisted in Sir Horace Vere's Protestant volunteer expedition which fought in the Thirty Years' War.
Morgan fought in the Low Countries and in particular assisted the Dutch in the decisive victory at the battle of the Slaak in 1631.

He fought under Thomas Fairfax in the First English Civil War. In 1645 he was appointed parliamentary governor of Gloucester. In 1646 he took Chepstow Castle and Monmouth, and besieged Raglan Castle. From 1651 to 1657 he assisted General George Monck in Scotland and was promoted to major-general. He was second in command in Flanders in 1657 and knighted on his return in 1658. He rejoined Monck in Scotland, and played a conspicuous part in the Stuart Restoration in Edinburgh. His Scottish command was disbanded in December, but he was rewarded with a baronetcy on 1 February 1661.

Morgan established the English Expedition to Portugal to help the Portuguese fight the Spanish. He was appointed Governor of Jersey in 1665 repairing the Jersey forts and reorganising the militia.

A pamphlet narrating his acts in France and Flanders in 1657 and 1658, said to be by himself was published in 1699.

His family home was the Old Court, Llangattock Lingoed in Monmouthshire.

Notes

References
 

Attribution

Further reading

1604 births
1679 deaths
People from Monmouthshire
Baronets in the Baronetage of England
Welsh soldiers
Governors of Jersey
Roundheads
Parliamentarian military personnel of the English Civil War